Lukas Nathanson (born 4 July 1986) is a Swedish record producer, composer and songwriter. He is commonly known for collaborating with producers Scott Effman,  Kenneth Coby as well as various artists including Akon, Chris Brown, Natalia Jiménez, Sofia Reyes, and Prince Royce. Nathanson was nominated for two Grammy Awards for his work on the albums Creo En Mi by Natalia Jiménez and X by Chris Brown.

Career
Nathanson started producing music in Stockholm, Sweden  and signed his first publishing deal at age 16 with reactive songs. In his early career, he has worked with Finnish rapper Pikku G, Cuban band Alianza and Japanese idol group Arashi. In 2012, Nathanson moved to the Los Angeles, where he started collaborating with writers and producers at recording studios. He later began a production duo with Scott Effman and worked with artists in various genres, including Akon, Chris Brown,  Boyz II Men, The Saturdays, Priscilla Renea, and Prince Royce. In 2014, Nathanson received a Grammy nomination for Chris Brown's X as the best urban contemporary album. In 2015, he received another Latin Grammy nomination for his work on Natalia Jimenez's album Creole en Mi. Lukas competed in Melodifestivalen with Vlad Reiser's ”Nakna I Regnet” in 2019 and with OVÖ's "Inga Problem" in 2020.

Production discography

References

1986 births
Living people
Swedish record producers
Swedish songwriters